is a former Japanese football player.

Club statistics

References

External links

1986 births
Living people
Association football people from Kanagawa Prefecture
Japanese footballers
J1 League players
J2 League players
J3 League players
Yokohama F. Marinos players
Yokohama FC players
SC Sagamihara players
Mito HollyHock players
Thespakusatsu Gunma players
Association football midfielders